The 1973 Australian Open was a tennis tournament played on outdoor grass courts at the Kooyong Lawn Tennis Club in Melbourne in Australia and was held from 26 December 1972 to 1 January 1973.  It was the 61st edition of the Australian Open and the first Grand Slam tournament of the year.

Seniors

Men's singles

 John Newcombe defeated  Onny Parun, 6–3, 6–7, 7–5, 6–1  
It was Newcombe's 5th career Grand Slam title, and his 1st Australian Open title.

Women's singles

 Margaret Court defeated  Evonne Goolagong, 6–4, 7–5

Men's doubles

 John Newcombe /  Malcolm Anderson defeated  John Alexander /  Phil Dent, 6–3, 6–4, 7–6

Women's doubles

 Margaret Court /  Virginia Wade defeated  Kerry Harris /  Kerry Melville, 6–4, 6–4

Mixed doubles
Competition not held between 1970 and 1986.

References

External links
 Australian Open official website

 
 

 
1973 in Australian tennis
1972 in Australian tennis
December 1972 sports events in Australia
January 1973 sports events in Australia
1973,Australian Open